The 6th New Zealand Parliament was a term of the Parliament of New Zealand.

Elections for this term were held in 69 European electorates between 20 December 1875 and 29 January 1876. Elections in the four Māori electorates were held on 4 and 15 January 1876. A total of 88 MPs were elected. Parliament was prorogued in August 1879. During the term of this Parliament, five Ministries were in power.

Sessions
The 6th Parliament opened on 15 June 1876, following the 1875–1876 general election. It sat for four sessions, and was prorogued on 15 August 1879.

Historical context
Political parties had not been established yet; this only happened after the 1890 election. Anyone attempting to form an administration thus had to win support directly from individual MPs. This made first forming, and then retaining a government difficult and challenging.

Ministries
Since July 1875, the Pollen Ministry was in power, led by Premier Daniel Pollen. On 15 February 1876, the second Vogel Ministry was established, which lasted until 1 September 1876. This was followed by the Atkinson Ministry, what is known as the beginning of the Continuous Ministry, which lasted from 1 to 13 September 1876. It was reconstituted as the second Atkinson Ministry, which ruled from 13 September 1876 to 13 October 1877. This was succeeded by the Grey Ministry, which was in power from 13 October 1877 to 8 October 1879. This period extended slightly after the period of the 1879 general elections for the 7th Parliament.

Initial composition of the 6th Parliament
88 seats were created across the electorates.

Changes during term
There were numerous changes during the term of the 6th Parliament.

Notes

References

06